Derrick "Tommy" Nicolas Silva (born February 21, 2002) is an American college soccer player who currently plays for the University of California, Los Angeles. Silva formerly played on an academy contract for FC Tucson in USL League One.

Playing career

Youth
Silva was a member of the Real Salt Lake at both their Arizona and Utah academies.

FC Tucson
On July 22, 2020, Silva signed a USL academy contract with USL League One side FC Tucson. He made his debut on August 8, 2020, appearing as an 89th-minute substitute during a 2–1 loss to Union Omaha.

UCLA
Silva committed to play college soccer at UCLA in the fall of 2020. Due to the COVID-19 pandemic, the season was delayed to spring 2021. Silva made his collegiate debut on February 8, 2021, in a 3–0 win against University of San Francisco. Silva started and played the entire match and had one assist. On March 24, 2021, Silva scored his first collegiate goal, in a 2–2 draw at San Diego State University. Silva finished the season with 12 appearances for the Bruins, and two goals. Following the 2020 NCAA Division I men's soccer season and 2020 Pac-12 Conference men's soccer season, he was named a third-team Freshman All-American by College Soccer News.

During his sophomore campaign, he so far has experienced a breakout season, scoring three goals in the program's first five matches.

References 

2002 births
American soccer players
Association football defenders
FC Tucson players
Living people
People from Tucson, Arizona
Real Salt Lake players
Soccer players from Arizona
UCLA Bruins men's soccer players
USL League One players